Edwin Russell "Mike" Snavely (March 5, 1912 – January 20, 1964) was an American football, basketball, tennis, and wrestling coach. He served as the head football coach at Moravian College from 1937 to 1938, East Stroudsburg State Teachers College—now known as East Stroudsburg University of Pennsylvania—from 1939 to 1941, and DePauw University from 1947 to 1955, compiling a career college football coaching  record of 49–61–3. Snavely was also the head basketball coach at Moravian from 1937 to 1939, tallying mark of 14–22.

Head coaching record

Football

References

External links
 

1912 births
1964 deaths
American football fullbacks
DePauw Tigers football coaches
DePauw Tigers men's basketball coaches
East Stroudsburg Warriors football coaches
Illinois Fighting Illini football players
Moravian Greyhounds athletic directors
Moravian Greyhounds football coaches
College tennis coaches in the United States
College wrestling coaches in the United States
People from Clark County, Illinois
Players of American football from Illinois